Hæåk is a very small farming village in Lyngdal municipality in Agder county, Norway. Originally, the farm was not accessible by road, and only a few farmers lived there. However, in 1987 a steep road leading down to Hæåk was built, and it has since become a popular place for bicycling enthusiasts.

The main industry in the area of Hæåk is gravel production.

References

Villages in Agder
Lyngdal